Seven Letters is Tonus Peregrinus's first album of unaccompanied choral works by Antony Pitts released on Hyperion Records.  The album contains the only-known complete setting of the seven letters from the Book of Revelation. Tracks from the album have been broadcast on BBC Radio 3, and the opening work Adoro Te was sung at the memorial for Alexander Litvinenko in 2006.

References

2005 classical albums
Tonus Peregrinus albums